Ondřej Havelka (born October 10, 1954) is a Czech jazz and swing singer, actor, and director.

Career
Havelka has been the lead vocalist for the Original Prague Syncopated Orchestra (1976-1995) and for Ondřej Havelka and his Melody Makers (1995 to present), and has directed and appeared in musicals and award-winning music videos.

Awards
In 1995 the Czech Academy of Popular Music (Akademie populární hudby) voted Děkuji, bylo to krásné, which he directed and performs in, the Anděl Award ("Czech Grammy") for Clip of the Year. In 1996 Havelka received a personal Anděl award as Jazzman of the Year.

Discography

With the Original Prague Syncopated Orchestra
 Originální Pražský Synkopický Orchestr (1979, LP Supraphon & WAM – Germany)
 Srdce Mé Odešlo Za Tebou - 2 skladby (1980, SP Panton)
 Stará Natoč Gramofon (1982, LP Panton + reed. CD)
 Jazz & Hot Dance Music 1923 - 31 (1984, LP Panton + reed. CD)
 Sám s Děvčetem v Dešti (1989, LP Panton + reed. CD)
 Hello Baby (1994, CD EMI – Monitor)

With the Melody Makers
 Ondřej Havelka uvádí The Swings (1995, Monitor/EMI. CD)
 Mě to tady nebaví (1998, Monitor/EMI. CD)
 Jen pro ten dnešní den (1999, Monitor/EMI. CD)
 Rhapsody In Blue: Pocta George Gershwinovi (1999, Monitor/EMI. CD)
 Swing It (2000, V.O.X. Music GmbH. CD)
 Vzpomínky na hvězdný prach (2002, Hot Jazz. CD)
 Nejlepší kusy z repertoiru Ondřeje Havelky a jeho Melody Makers (2003, Monitor/EMI. CD)
 Tentokrát zcela Rozvrkočení / This Time Completely off their Noodles (2005, Hot Jazz. CD)
 Ondřej Havelka a jeho Melody Makers vám přejí veselé vánoce. Bílé a oranžové (2005. CD)
 Rhapsody In Blue Room (2007. CD)

Filmography

Writer and director
 Zdravý nemocný Vlastimilený Brodský (1999)
 Poslední mohykán (The Last of the Mohicans, 2009) - a documentary mapping the life story of jazz musician Jiří Traxler.

Actor
 Saturnin (1994) as Jirí Oulický
 Kafka (1991) as Friend of Kafka
 Nefnukej, veverko! (1988) as Father's friend
 Není sirotek jako sirotek (1986) as Jirka Spevácek
 Chobotnice z druhého patra (1986) as Bóda
 Rumburak (1985) as Mr. Tumlír
 Cesta kolem mé hlavy (1984) as Professor Robert Kilian
 Pod nohama nebe (1983) as Petr
 Krakonos a lyzníci (1981) as Teacher
 Koncert na konci léta (1980) as Fenix
 Reknem si to prístí léto (1977) as Karel

References

External links
Interview for Radio Prague.
Profile of Havelka at the Prague State Opera.
Profile of Havelka at the National Theatre (Prague).
Melody Makers official website.

1954 births
Living people
Czech jazz bandleaders
Czech jazz singers
Czechoslovak male singers
Czech music video directors
Czech male film actors
Janáček Academy of Music and Performing Arts alumni
Male jazz musicians
20th-century Czech male singers
21st-century Czech male singers
Musicians from Prague